Northern River (Japanese :ノーザンリバー, foaled  April 12, 2008) is a Japanese Thoroughbred racehorse and the winner of the 2011 Arlington Cup.

Career 
His brother is Renforcer, who won the 2012 Diolite Kinen.

Northern River's first race was on September 11, 2010, at Sapporo, where he came in 2nd. Northern River picked up his win in Kyoto on January 16, 2011. He then picked up another win 2 week later in Kyoto, and then won the 2011 Arlington Cup.

This win helped earn Northern River a place in the Grade-1, 2011 Satsuki Sho, where he finished in a disappointing 15th place. He attempted another Grade-1 race in May 2011, where he came in 17th at the 2011 Tokyo Yūshun.

He did not race in 2012. In 2013, he picked up another win at the 2013 Fukakusa Stakes in Kyoto. Later in November, he picked up another win at Kyoto. He then scored a Grade-3 win, by winning the 2013 Capella Stakes.

He spent 2014 competing in graded races. In February, he came in 4th at the 2014 February Stakes, and then won the Tokyo Spring in April, and won the Sakitama Cup in Urawa in May. He then picked up his last win on the year in October at the 2014 Tokyo Hai.

2015 was his last year in racing. He placed 3rd at the Tokyo Sprint in April, then won the Sakitama Cup in May. He then retired after an 8th place finish at the 2015 Japan Breeding farms' Cup Sprint.

Stud career
Northern River's descendants include:

c = colt, f = filly

Pedigree

References

2008 racehorse births
Thoroughbred family B3